Muḥammad Abū Numayy II ibn Barakāt ibn Muḥammad was Sharif of Mecca from 1512 to 1566. He co-reigned first with his father (1512–1525) and later with his sons (1540–1566).

Muhammad Abu Numayy was born in Mecca on the night of 9 Dhu al-Hijjah 911 AH, the son of Sharif Barakat II. His mother was Sharifah Ghabyah, the daughter of Humaydan ibn Shaman al-Husayni, Emir of Medina.

At the age of six he was appointed co-ruler with his father by the Sharif's Mamluk suzerain, Sultan Qansuh al-Ghawri of Egypt. In 1517 after the Ottoman conquest of Egypt, Barakat quickly recognized the change in sovereignty. He sent Abu Numayy to Sultan Selim I in Cairo, bearing the keys to the holy cities and other gifts, and the Sultan confirmed Barakat and Abu Numayy in their positions as co-rulers of the Hejaz. Following his father's death in 1525 Abu Numayy assumed sole rulership of the Hejaz. Later in 947 AH (1540) he secured from Sultan Suleiman I the appointment of his eldest son Ahmad as his co-ruler, and then the appointment of his next eldest son, Hasan, after Ahmad's death in 961 AH (1554).

In 974 AH (1566/1567) Abu Numayy received permission to abdicate in favor of Sharif Hasan. After retiring from the Sharifate he devoted his time to worship and religious studies while continuing to assist his son in an advisory capacity. He died on 9 Muharram 992 AH at Wadi al-Abar, south of Mecca. He was prayed over in Masjid al-Haram and buried in Jannat al-Mu'alla, where a tomb was constructed over his grave.

Notes

References

Bibliography

1506 births
1584 deaths
16th-century Arabs
Sharifs of Mecca
Banu Qatadah
Arabs from the Ottoman Empire
Burials at Jannat al-Mu'alla